Arthur Thibert is a comic book artist, primarily known as a freelance inker, although he has a substantial résumé as a penciler and has even written some comics. Thibert is best known for his work as an inker for Marvel Comics on their various X-Men titles during the 1990s.

Freelance inker 
Thibert broke into comics in 1986, as an inker for WaRP Graphics' Myth Adventures. He truly latched on to the industry in 1989, becoming regular inker (over Dan Jurgens' pencils) for DC's The Adventures of Superman until 1991.

From 1991 to 2004 (with a break from 1993 to 1995), Thibert inked almost exclusively for Marvel, many of those years spent on their X-Men titles. He inked X-Factor for much of 1991, and was the regular inker of X-Men vol. 2 in 1992.

From 1993 to 1995, Thibert associated himself with the "upstart" Image Comics, where he primarily inked covers, for such titles as Spawn, Supreme, Team Youngblood, and Brigade.

Returning to Marvel, Thibert inked Carlos Pacheco on X-Men vol. 2 from 1996 to 1998. He also returned to X-Factor in 1997. In addition, during the 1990s Thibert inked over twenty issues of The Uncanny X-Men. From 1999 to 2000, Thibert inked virtually the entire run of Bishop: The Last X-Man (over penciller Georges Jeanty). He was the regular inker of Ultimate X-Men in 2001 (over Adam Kubert), and again from 2003 to 2004 (over David Finch).

Other regular inking duties Thibert performed during this period included Fantastic Four vol. 3 (over Salvador Larroca) from 1998 to 2000; and Ultimate Spider-Man (over Mark Bagley's pencils) from 2000 to 2004.

In 2005, Thibert moved back to DC, where he inked the Outsiders from 2005 to 2007,  mostly over Matthew Clark's pencils. During this period he also penciled and inked covers for The Flash. In 2007, Thibert was the regular inker of The Flash: The Fastest Man Alive; and in 2008 he returned to inking Mark Bagley on DC's Trinity title.

Creator-owned projects
In 1994, Image also published three issues of Thibert's own title Black and White.

In 2004, Image published one issue of Thibert's creator-owned series Chrono Mechanics (co-written with Rich Birdsall),  a light-hearted adventure series about four very different individuals (human and otherwise) that were brought together to "fix" time. In 2006, Alias Enterprises published four more issues of the title.

Hack Shack Studios 
Thibert owns and operates Art Thibert's Hack Shack Studios, a California-based art and design studio serving the "television, advertising, comic book, and movie industries. Notable clients include Marvel Comics, DC Comics, MGM, TV Guide, and MTV." Projects in the works from Hack Shack include Rock 'N' Roll Botz, Kid Everything, and The Nightmare Files.

Awards 
Thibert has twice won the Wizard Fan Award for Favorite Inker, in 2001 and 2002. In addition, he was nominated for a 1992 Eisner Award for Best Inker (for his work on The Uncanny X-Men). In 2011 Thibert was awarded the Props Award for inker deserving more recognition by the Inkwell Awards.

Selected works 

  As inker, unless otherwise noted
 The Adventures of Superman (DC, 1989–1991)
 X-Factor (Marvel, 1991, 1997)
 Superman: The Wedding Album (DC, 1996)
 X-Men vol. 2 (Marvel, 1992, 1996–1998)
 Fantastic Four vol. 3 (1998–2000)
 Bishop: The Last X-Man (Marvel, 1999–2000)
 Ultimate Spider-Man (Marvel, 2000–2004)
 Ultimate X-Men (Marvel, 2001, 2003–2004)
 Chrono Mechanics (Image, 2004; Alias Enterprises, 2006) — writer/artist
 Outsiders (DC, 2005–2007)
 The Flash: The Fastest Man Alive (DC, 2007)
 Trinity (DC, 2008)

Notes

References 
 Art Thibert at the Comic Book DB

External links
 Official website: Art By Thibert
 Contino, Jennifer. "Art Thibert Inking Flash & More," Comicon.com: The Pulse (March 9, 2007).
 Phillips, Mike. Art Thibert interview about Chrono Mechanics, Sequart Organization (December 24, 2004).
 Phillips, Mike. Art Thibert interview about Chrono Mechanics Silver, Sequart Organization (November 5, 2005).
 "Talking Shop With Chrono Mechanics’ Art Thibert & Rich Birdsall!", TheComicFanatic.com (April 29, 2006).

Living people
Year of birth missing (living people)
American comics artists
DC Comics people